Richard Reynolds is a Guyana footballer who currently plays for SV Nishan 42 in the SVB Hoofdklasse   and the Guyana national team.

References

Living people
People from Demerara-Mahaica
Association football goalkeepers
Guyanese footballers
Guyanese expatriate footballers
Guyana international footballers
Expatriate footballers in Suriname
Morvant Caledonia United players
S.V. Robinhood players
Alpha United FC players
SVB Eerste Divisie players
TT Pro League players
1980 births
Expatriate footballers in Trinidad and Tobago
Guyanese expatriate sportspeople in Suriname
Guyanese expatriate sportspeople in Trinidad and Tobago